Manga are comics or graphic novels originating from Japan.

Manga may also refer to:

Arts, entertainment and media
 Manga (band), stylized maNga, a Turkish rock band
Manga (album), 2004
Manga+, 2006
 Manga (magazine), a free quarterly by Tokyopop
 Manga Entertainment, an American company
 Hokusai Manga, a collection of sketches by Hokusai
 The Citi Exhibition: Manga, an exhibition at the British Museum

Languages
Manga language (China), a Lolo-Burmese language
Manga Kanuri, a dialect of Kanuri language in Central Africa

Places
 Manga Department, department in Zoundwéogo Province, Burkina Faso
 Manga, Burkina Faso, capital of Manga Department and Zoundwéogo Province, Burkina Faso

People
 Manga (surname)
 Manga (footballer) (Haílton Corrêa de Arruda, born 1937), a Brazilian footballer
 Manga (rapper), a member of the British grime crew Roll Deep
 Manga Arabs, Omani Arabs who have immigrated to parts of East Africa

Other uses 
 Manga (moth), of the family Noctuidae 
 Manga, a sub-formation of the tercio of the Spanish Army
 Manga, word for mango in Portuguese and other languages

See also
Mangas (disambiguation)
Mango (disambiguation)
Mangga Buang language
Original English-language manga
Manga Bell, a Cameroonian surname